Sanders-Hairr House is a historic home located near Clayton, Johnston County, North Carolina.  It was built about 1787, and is a two-story, five-bay, transitional Georgian / Federal style frame dwelling.  It is sheathed in weatherboard, is flanked by massive double-shouldered exterior end chimneys, and has a full-width shed roofed one-story front porch.

It was listed on the National Register of Historic Places in 1971.

References

Houses on the National Register of Historic Places in North Carolina
Georgian architecture in North Carolina
Federal architecture in North Carolina
Houses completed in 1787
Houses in Johnston County, North Carolina
National Register of Historic Places in Johnston County, North Carolina
1787 establishments in North Carolina